is a railway station in the city of Iwanuma, Miyagi Prefecture, Japan, operated by East Japan Railway Company (JR East).

Lines
It is also served by the Jōban Line, and is 343.1 rail kilometers from the starting point of that line Nippori Station in Tokyo.

Station layout
The station has one side platform and two island platforms connected to the station building by a footbridge. The station has a "Midori no Madoguchi" staffed ticket office.

Platforms

History
Iwanuma Station opened on 15 December 1887, on the Tōhoku Main Line. The Joban Line opened on 10 November 1897. The station was absorbed into the JR East network upon the privatization of the Japanese National Railways (JNR) on 1 April 1987. A new station building was completed in June 1998.

Passenger statistics
In fiscal 2018, the station was used by an average of 7,093 passengers daily (boarding passengers only).

Surrounding area
 Iwanuma City Hall
 Takekoma Shrine
Iwanuma Post Office

See also
 List of Railway Stations in Japan

References

External links

  

Railway stations in Miyagi Prefecture
Tōhoku Main Line
Jōban Line
Railway stations in Japan opened in 1887
Iwanuma, Miyagi